William Charles Goffin (12 December 1920 –  15 September 1987) was an English professional footballer who played in the Football League for Aston Villa and Walsall. He was often referred to by his nickname "Cowboy".

Having previously played locally for Amington Village, Goffin played briefly for Tamworth before moving to Aston Villa as an amateur in August 1937. He signed professional forms with the club in December 1937. During World War II, Goffin made 82 appearances for Villa, scoring 47 goals, and also guested for Tamworth, Birmingham, Leicester City, Nottingham Forest and Swansea Town. In 1952, he scored four goals in a 19–2 win against RAF Lichfield in the Birmingham & District League. He remained at Villa until his transfer to Walsall in August 1954. In all, he made 255 first team appearances for Villa, scoring 89 goals. Of these, 156 appearances and 39 goals came in the Football League. He played for Walsall for one season, making eight League appearances.

In 1955, Goffin became the first manager of Tamworth – the club had previously been run by committee – when he rejoined the club as player-manager. While at the club, he combined his role with a job as a collector for the East Midlands Electricity Board. In February 1958, Goffin resigned as manager and was replaced by Vernon Chapman. He continued playing until the end of the 1960–61 season. He was awarded a testimonial in May 1961.

Managerial statistics

References

Bibliography

1920 births
1987 deaths
Sportspeople from Tamworth, Staffordshire
Association football forwards
English footballers
Tamworth F.C. players
Aston Villa F.C. players
Birmingham City F.C. wartime guest players
Leicester City F.C. wartime guest players
Nottingham Forest F.C. wartime guest players
Swansea Town A.F.C. wartime guest players
Walsall F.C. players
Tamworth F.C. managers
English football managers